Garikoitz Bravo Oiarbide (born 31 July 1989 in Lazkao) is a Spanish cyclist, who currently rides for UCI ProTeam . In August 2018, he was named in the startlist for the Vuelta a España.

Major results

2008
 1st Stage 1 Bizkaiko Bira
2009
 1st Time trial, Basque Country Under-23 Road Championships
 2nd Time trial, National Under-23 Road Championships
2011
 1st  Mountains classification Tour de l'Avenir
2012
 9th Vuelta a La Rioja
2013
 10th Overall Tour of Beijing
2014
 8th Overall Volta ao Alentejo
2015
 1st  Mountains classification Vuelta a Castilla y León
 5th Overall Vuelta a Asturias
 8th Overall Tour du Gévaudan Languedoc-Roussillon
 8th Prueba Villafranca de Ordizia
2016
 4th Overall Vuelta a Asturias
 4th Overall Vuelta a la Comunidad de Madrid
 8th Overall Vuelta a Castilla y León
 8th Prueba Villafranca de Ordizia
 10th Vuelta a La Rioja
2017
 5th Overall Vuelta a la Comunidad de Madrid
 8th Klasika Primavera
 9th Overall Volta ao Alentejo
 10th Vuelta a Asturias
2018
 5th Overall Vuelta a Aragón
 7th Grand Prix de Plumelec-Morbihan
2019
 6th Overall Vuelta a la Comunidad de Madrid
 8th Prueba Villafranca de Ordizia
 9th Overall Troféu Joaquim Agostinho
 9th Classic Sud-Ardèche
2021
 10th Overall Presidential Tour of Turkey

Grand Tour general classification results timeline

References

External links

1989 births
Living people
Spanish male cyclists
Cyclists from the Basque Country (autonomous community)
People from Goierri
Sportspeople from Gipuzkoa